Memorial High School is a public high school in Eau Claire, Wisconsin that serves grades 9 through 12. It is one of three high schools in the Eau Claire Area School District.

Academics 
Advanced Placement (AP) classes are offered in English, art, music, science, social sciences, and math. About half of Memorial students take AP classes.

Music 
Memorial has two competitive show choirs, the mixed-gender Old Abe Show Choir and the women's-only Eagle Show Choir. The school hosts a show choir competition, Winterfest, which takes place on the first weekend of February each year.
Memorial also has three orchestras, the Entry Level Orchestra, the Concert Orchestra and the Old Abe Orchestra.  The orchestras play in various events all throughout the year.

Athletics 
Memorial belongs to the Big Rivers Conference for athletics.  It has teams in football, cross country, soccer, golf, swimming and diving, tennis, volleyball, basketball, gymnastics, hockey, wrestling, baseball, softball, and track and field. The boys' hockey team won state championships in 2008 and 2013. The girls' cross country team won back-to-back state championships in 2014 and 2015.

In the news
In fall of 1992, a 17-year-old student, April Schuldt, who was four months pregnant, received more than 100 votes in the Eau Claire Memorial High School homecoming election. The runner-up, Elizabeth Weld, received fewer than 70 votes but still was crowned queen at the 3-4 Oct. celebration.  The principal resigned and three assistant principals and a teacher were disciplined by the school board after an investigation found that ballots for April had been burned in a cover-up. Schuldt appeared on numerous TV talk shows after the incident. April's story was the partial inspiration for the book Election by Tom Perrotta, which was subsequently made into the 1999 movie Election starring Reese Witherspoon and Matthew Broderick.

In early November 2017, an unnamed 15 year old girl, wrote a message on one of the bathroom stalls claiming, “Get your students out B4 I kill them!  If you don’t they will die!  I have a loaded gun and bomb!”  Eau Claire Police responded to the school and, with the help of administration, conducted a controlled evacuation of the school grounds.  No students were harmed or injured during this incident and the girl was later caught by police and sent to juvenile court on charges of terroristic threats.

Notable people

 Larry Balow – former Wisconsin State Assembly member
 Nickolas Butler – novelist and short story writer
 Jake Dowell – hockey player for the Chicago Blackhawks and University of Wisconsin-Madison
 Dave Duax – former Wisconsin Cabinet Secretary, Vice President of the Eau Claire City Council, and Chairman of the Eau Claire County Board.
 Sarah Godlewski – current Secretary of State of Wisconsin and former State Treasurer of Wisconsin
 Ann Jones – writer, journalist, photographer, educator and civil rights activist
 Michael Kapla – professional ice hockey player
 Geoffrey Keezer – pianist
 Scott D. Legwold – U.S. National Guard general
 Chuck Mencel – former basketball player for the Minneapolis Lakers
 Tom Poquette (1970) – Major League Baseball outfielder, 1973, 1976–1979, 1981–1982
 Justin Vernon – frontman for indie band Bon Iver
 Joe Bee Xiong – first Hmong person elected to public office in the United States

References

Public high schools in Wisconsin
Buildings and structures in Eau Claire, Wisconsin
Schools in Eau Claire County, Wisconsin